Loveline was a weekly television talk show that aired on MTV from 1996 to 2000, hosted by Drew Pinsky, a doctor and addiction medicine specialist, and comedian Adam Carolla. It is an adaptation of Loveline, a radio call-in show that the two hosted at the same time. The show always featured a third, female call-in host; eight different women appeared in that role throughout the show's run. There was typically a celebrity guest as well, usually an actor or musician. Together, the group would take questions from, and offer advice to, teenagers and young adults on subjects including sex, relationships and drug use.

Loveline was produced by Stone Stanley Productions, and was distributed by Westwood One.

The show's female co-hosts were:
 Kris McGaha (1996–1997)
 Laura Kightlinger (1997)
 Lou Thornton (1997)
 Carmen Electra (1997)
 Idalis DeLeon (1997)
 Diane Farr (1998)
 Catherine McCord (1999–2000)
 Donna D'Errico (Loveline: Live in Times Square) (2000)
 Sasha Alexander (2001)

References

External links 
 
 

1996 American television series debuts
2000 American television series endings
2000s American television talk shows
American late-night television shows
MTV original programming
Sex education television series
Television series based on radio series
Television series by Stone Stanley Entertainment